"Ten Thousand Fists" is a song by American heavy metal band Disturbed. It was released on December 28, 2006 as the fifth single from their studio album, Ten Thousand Fists. The track is used in the video game Madden NFL 06.

Themes
According to Disturbed's vocalist David Draiman, the song "signifies strength, unity, conviction, power, and the exhilaration that you feel when you get to see that at one of our shows. It's one of my favorite moments, and people know that I have an affinity for asking people to put their fists in the air, and it's just, it's exhilaration to be able to see ten thousand raised fists or more."

Charts

Personnel
 David Draiman – vocals
 Dan Donegan – guitars, electronics
 John Moyer – bass
 Mike Wengren – drums

References

2006 singles
2005 songs
Disturbed (band) songs
Song recordings produced by Johnny K
Songs written by David Draiman
Songs written by Dan Donegan
Songs written by Mike Wengren